Məlikçobanlı (also, Melikchobanly and Melik-Chobany) is a village and municipality in the Shamakhi Rayon of Azerbaijan.  It has a population of 1,887.

References 

Populated places in Shamakhi District